The dalmatic is a long, wide-sleeved tunic, which serves as a liturgical vestment in the Catholic, Lutheran, Anglican, United Methodist, and some other churches. When used, it is the proper vestment of a deacon at Mass, Holy Communion or other services such as baptism or marriage held in the context of a Eucharistic service. Although infrequent, it may also be worn by bishops above the alb and below the chasuble, and is then referred to as pontifical dalmatic.

Like the chasuble worn by priests and bishops, it is an outer vestment and is supposed to match the liturgical colour of the day. The dalmatic is often made of the same material and decoration as a chasuble, so as to form a matching pair. Traditional Solemn Mass vestment sets include matching chasuble, dalmatic, and tunicle.

A dalmatic is also worn by the British monarch during the Coronation service.

History 
In the Roman Empire, the dalmatic was an amply sleeved tunic (from Dalmatia) with wide stripes (clavi) that were sometimes worked with elaborate designs. Dalmatics had become typical attire for upper-class women in the latter part of the 3rd century AD. They are pictured in a few funerary portraits on shrouds from Antinoopolis in Roman Egypt. Literary sources record dalmatics as imperial gifts to individuals.

It was a normal item of clothing at the time when ecclesiastical clothes began to develop separately around the fourth century, worn over a longer tunic by the upper classes, and as the longest part of the dress of men of lower rank.

The dalmatic was a garment of Byzantine dress, and was adopted by Emperor Paul I of the Russian Empire as a coronation and liturgical vestment. In Orthodox icons of Jesus Christ as King and Great High Priest he is shown in a dalmatic.

Roman Church 

The dalmatic is a robe with wide sleeves; it reaches to at least the knees or lower. In 18th-century vestment fashion, it is customary to slit the under side of the sleeves so that the dalmatic becomes a mantle like a scapular with an opening for the head and two square pieces of the material falling from the shoulder over the upper arm. Modern dalmatics tend to be longer and have closed sleeves, with the sides being open below the sleeve. The distinctive ornamentation of the vestment consists of two vertical stripes running from the shoulder to the hem; according to Roman usage these stripes are narrow and sometimes united at the bottom by two narrow cross-stripes. Outside of Rome the vertical stripes are quite broad and the cross-piece is on the upper part of the garment. At a Pontifical High Mass, a dalmatic (usually made of lighter material) is worn by the bishop under the chasuble. At solemn papal liturgical occasions the Pope is assisted by two cardinal-deacons vested in a dalmatic and wearing a mitra simplex (simple white mitre).

In the Roman Catholic Church the subdeacons wore a vestment called the tunicle, which was originally distinct from a dalmatic, but by the 17th century the two had become identical, though a tunicle was often less ornamented than a dalmatic, the main difference often being only one horizontal stripe versus the two becoming a deacon's vestment. Additionally, unlike deacons, subdeacons do not wear a stole under their tunicle. Today, the tunicle is rare in the Roman Catholic Church as only certain authorized clerical societies (such as the Priestly Fraternity of St. Peter) have subdeacons.

Traditionally the dalmatic was not used in the Roman Rite by deacons during Lent. In its place, depending on the point in the liturgy, was worn either a folded chasuble or what was called a broad stole, which represented a rolled-up chasuble. This tradition went back to a time at which the dalmatic was still considered an essential secular garment and thus not appropriate to be worn during the penitential season of Lent.

Eastern tradition 

In the Byzantine Rite the sakkos, which is elaborately decorated and amply cut, usually worn by the bishops as an outer vestment in place of a presbyter's phelonion and which, like the phelonion, corresponds to the western chasuble and cope, is derived from Byzantine imperial dress, and hence is identical in origin to the Western dalmatic.

In all Eastern rites the sticharion (which is analogous to the Western alb), of the ornate sort worn by deacons and lower clergy, is sometimes referred to as a dalmatic.

References

External links 

 History of the Dalmatic in the Catholic Church
 

Methodism
Anglican vestments
Eastern Christian vestments
Lutheran vestments
Roman Catholic vestments
History of clothing
History of clothing (Western fashion)
History of fashion
Robes and cloaks
Byzantine clothing